Ross, Skye and Inverness West was a constituency of the House of Commons of the Parliament of the United Kingdom from 1997 to 2005. The constituency elected one Member of Parliament (MP) by the first-past-the-post system of election.

The constituency was formed by merging most of the former Ross, Cromarty and Skye constituency (that constituency minus an Easter Ross area) with part of the former Inverness, Nairn and Lochaber constituency.

When abolished in 2005 much of the area of the constituency became part of the then new Ross, Skye and Lochaber constituency. Most of the rest went to Inverness, Nairn, Badenoch and Strathspey while a tiny portion joined Caithness, Sutherland and Easter Ross.

There was also a Ross, Skye and Inverness West constituency of the Scottish Parliament, which was created in 1999 with the same boundaries as the former House of Commons constituency.

Boundaries
Skye and Lochalsh District, the Inverness District electoral divisions of Aird North, Aird South, Ballifeary-Columba, Caledonian Canal, Merkinch, and Scorguie, and the Ross and Cromarty District electoral divisions of Alness and Ardross, Black Isle East, Black Isle West, Dingwall, Ferindonald, Lochbroom, Ord and Conon, Strathconon, and Wester Ross.

Council area
See also Politics of the Highland council area

The constituency area was entirely within the Highland unitary council area. In terms of Highland Council committee areas it covered  Ross and Cromarty minus an Easter Ross area, all of Skye and Lochalsh, and part of Inverness.

Members of Parliament
Charles Kennedy of the Liberal Democrats was elected in 1997 and re-elected in 2001. Most of Kennedy's tenure as leader of his party coincided with his time as MP for this seat. When the constituency was abolished in 2005, Kennedy was elected MP for Ross, Skye and Lochaber.

Election results

Elections of the 2000s

Elections of the 1990s

References 

Historic parliamentary constituencies in Scotland (Westminster)
Constituencies of the Parliament of the United Kingdom established in 1997
Constituencies of the Parliament of the United Kingdom disestablished in 2005
Highland constituencies, UK Parliament (historic)